Revigrés is a Portuguese producer of ceramics founded in 1977 by Adolfo Roque (1934–2008), who chaired the company until 2007. The company's products, mainly ceramic tiles covering floors and walls, are known worldwide. Revigrés sponsored for many years F.C.Porto, a professional Portuguese football team. The firm has more than 350 workers and the 2009 revenue was nearly 60M€.

Starting the project in 1993 Portuguese architect Álvaro Siza Vieira designed and built an exhibition and sales hall at the Revigrés factory site near Águeda. The Revigrés Commercial Building (which includes an exhibition hall, auditorium and offices) was inaugurated in 1997 to commemorate the 20th anniversary of Revigrés.

External links
 Official website of Revigrés

References

Ceramics manufacturers of Portugal
Álvaro Siza Vieira buildings
Modernist architecture in Portugal
Portuguese brands